Nehemiah Kish is an American retired ballet dancer. He was a principal dancer of the Royal Ballet in London.

Early life
Kish was born in Caro, Michigan.

Career
Kish first trained in gymnastics and jazz dance, before changing to ballet. He joined the National Ballet of Canada School aged 13 and graduated into the company in 2001, being promoted to principal in 2005. In 2008, Kish joined the Royal Danish Ballet as a principal dancer. In 2010, he joined the Royal Ballet, also as a principal. He retired from the company in 2019.

References

Living people
American male ballet dancers
Royal Danish Ballet principal dancers
Principal dancers of The Royal Ballet
People from Caro, Michigan
Year of birth missing (living people)